Pain Killer is the sixth studio album by American country music group Little Big Town. It was released on October 21, 2014, through Capitol Nashville. Little Big Town co-wrote eight of the album's thirteen tracks. Pain Killer was produced by Jay Joyce.

Critical reception

Rating Pain Killer a "B+", Bob Paxman of Country Weekly praised the group's vocal harmonies and the songwriting, particularly the songs written by Lori McKenna, but criticized the "overly cluttered" production on some tracks. Stephen Thomas Erlewine of AllMusic called the album as "the rarest thing in contemporary country, a record with an expansive world-view delivered with a kinetic kick and infallible melodies, a record that gives no indication of where it's going upon first listen but remains compelling upon further spins". The album has a score of 83 on Metacritic indicating “universal acclaim.”

Accolades

Commercial performance
The album debuted at number seven on Billboard 200 and number three on Top Country Albums chart, selling 42,000 copies in its first week. As of January 2017, the album has sold 511,300 copies in the United States. The album was certified platinum by the Recording Industry Association of America (RIAA) for combined sales and album-equivalent units of over a million units.

Track listing
The album's track listing was announced on July 14.

Personnel
Adapted from Allmusic and Pain Killer liner notes.

Little Big Town
Karen Fairchild — vocals
Kimberly Schlapman — vocals
Philip Sweet — vocals, drums, acoustic guitar
Jimi Westbrook — vocals, acoustic guitar

Musicians
Johnny Duke — acoustic guitar, electric guitar, pedal steel guitar
Jedd Hughes — acoustic guitar, electric guitar, ganjo, tiple
Jay Joyce — electric guitar, acoustic guitar, keyboards, ganjo, mandolin, synthesizer, bass guitar, bells, pump organ
Seth Rausch — drums
Giles Reaves — keyboards, percussion, vocoder, synthesizer horns, vibraphone, vocal pads
John Thomasson — bass guitar
Ryan Tyndell — acoustic guitar, 12-string guitar

Production
Richard Dodd — mastering
Jason Hall — engineering, mixing
Jedd Hughes — engineering
Scott Johnson — production assistant 
Jay Joyce — engineering, mixing, production
Reid Scelza — assistant
Matthew Wheeler — assistant 

Visual and imagery
Karen Fairchild — art direction
Kelly Jerrell — art direction
Meritocracy — art direction
Matthew Welch — photography

Charts

Chart positions

Year-end charts

Certifications

References

2014 albums
Little Big Town albums
Capitol Records albums
Albums produced by Jay Joyce